The Herzog family is a Jewish family that includes the sixth President of Israel and the Chief Rabbi of Israel.

Family tree 
Some of the family members include:
Please note capitalization of surnames is typically used in genealogy trees

 Joel Leib HERZOG. Married to Liba Miriam CYROWICZ. 
 Rabbi Yitzchak-Isaac Ha-Levi HERZOG. Born: 3 Dec 1888, Łomża, Poland. Died: 25 Jul 1959. Married to Sara HILLMAN (daughter of Rabbi Samuel Isaac HILLMAN)
 Chaim Hyman HERZOG. Born: 17 Sep 1918, Belfast, Ireland. Died: 17 Apr 1997, Tel Aviv, Israel. Married to Aura AMBACHE.
 Itzchak-Isaac "Bougie" HERZOG. Born: 1960, Tel Aviv, Israel. Married to Michal AFEK
 Yaacov-Jacob David HERZOG. Born: 1921. Died: 1972.
 Suzy HERZOG. Married to Abba EBAN
 Eli EBAN. Born: New York City, New York

References

 
Jewish families